Karhulan Ilmailukerhon Aviation Museum is a museum specialized in aircraft, located at Kymi Airfield in Kotka, Finland. The museum opened in 1992. A new 600 m2 display hall was opened in 1995.
 
The museum is run by the Karhulan Ilmailukerho who is the guild association for Hävittäjälentolaivue 34.

Aircraft
 Mikoyan MiG-21F
 Mikoyan MiG-21BIS
 Saab 35 Draken
 Fouga Magister
 Folland Gnat Mk.1 
 Focke-Wulf Fw 44 J Stieglitz
 Gloster Gauntlet Mk.II
 Harakka I
 Harakka II
 Muna-Harakka II
 PIK-7 Harakka III
 PIK-5c
 K-8B
 KK-1e Utu
 Moottori-Harakka

A K-7 and a Bocian are currently being restored.

See also
List of aerospace museums

External links

Karhulan Ilmailukerhon Aviation Museum
Unofficial web page

Aerospace museums in Finland
Kotka
Museums in Kymenlaakso